Gradshteyn and Ryzhik (GR) is the informal name of a comprehensive table of integrals originally compiled by the Russian mathematicians I. S. Gradshteyn and I. M. Ryzhik. Its full title today is Table of Integrals, Series, and Products.

Since its first publication in 1943, it was considerably expanded and it soon became a "classic" and highly regarded reference for mathematicians, scientists and engineers. After the deaths of the original authors, the work was maintained and further expanded by other editors.

At some stage a German and English dual-language translation became available, followed by Polish, English-only and Japanese versions. After several further editions, the Russian and German-English versions went out of print and have not been updated after the fall of the Iron Curtain, but the English version is still being actively maintained and refined by new editors, and it has recently been retranslated back into Russian as well.

Overview
One of the valuable characteristics of Gradshteyn and Ryzhik compared to similar compilations is that most listed integrals are referenced. The literature list contains 92 main entries and 140 additional entries (in the eighth English edition). The integrals are classified by numbers, which haven't changed from the fourth Russian up to the seventh English edition (the numbering in older editions as well as in the eighth English edition is not fully compatible).
The book does not only contain the integrals, but also lists additional properties and related special functions.
It also includes tables for integral transforms.
Another advantage of Gradshteyn and Ryzhik compared to computer algebra systems is the fact that all special functions and constants used in the evaluation of the integrals are listed in a registry as well, thereby allowing reverse lookup of integrals based on special functions or constants.

On the downsides, Gradshteyn and Ryzhik has become known to contain a relatively high number of typographical errors even in newer editions, which has repeatedly led to the publication of extensive errata lists. Earlier English editions were also criticized for their poor translation of mathematical terms and mediocre print quality.

History
The work was originally compiled by the Russian mathematicians Iosif Moiseevich Ryzhik (Russian: ,) and Izrail Solomonovich Gradshteyn (Russian: ,). While some contents were original, significant portions were collected from other previously existing integral tables like David Bierens de Haan's  (1867), Václav Jan Láska's  (1888–1894) or Edwin Plimpton Adams' and Richard Lionel Hippisley's Smithsonian Mathematical Formulae and Tables of Elliptic Functions (1922).

The first edition, which contained about 5 000 formulas, was authored by Ryzhik, who had already published a book on special functions in 1936 and died during World War II around 1941. Not announcing this fact, his compilation was published posthumously in 1943, followed by a second corrected edition in his name in 1948.

The third edition (1951) was worked on by Gradshteyn, who also introduced the chapter numbering system in decimal notation. Gradshteyn planned considerable expansion for the fourth edition, a work he could not finish due to his own death. Therefore, the fourth (1962/1963) and fifth (1971) editions were continued by Yuri Veniaminovich Geronimus (Russian: ,) and Michail Yulyevich Tseytlin (Russian: ,). The fourth edition contained about 12 000 formulas already.

Based on the third Russian edition, the first German-English edition with 5 400 formulas was published in 1957 by the East-German  (DVW) with German translations by Christa and Lothar Berg and the English texts by Martin Strauss. In  Karl Prachar wrote:

In 1963, it was followed by the second edition, a reprint edition with a four-page inlet listing corrections compiled by Eldon Robert Hansen.

Derived from the 1963 edition, but considerably expanded and split into two volumes, the third German-English edition by Ludwig Boll was finally published by MIR Moscow in 1981 (with permission of DVW and distributed through Verlag Harri Deutsch in the Western world); it incorporated the material of the fifth Russian edition (1971) as well.

Pending this third German-English edition an English-only edition by Alan Jeffrey was published in 1965. Lacking a clear designation by itself it was variously known as first, third or fourth English edition, as it was based on the then-current fourth Russian edition. The formulas were photographically reproduced and the text translated. This still held true for the expanded fourth English edition in 1980, which added chapters 10 to 17.

Both of these editions saw multiple print runs each incorporating newly found corrections. Starting with the third printing, updated table entries were marked by adding a small superscript number to the entry number indicating the corresponding print run ("3" etc.), a convention carried over into later editions by continuing to increase the superscript number as kind of a revision number (no longer directly corresponding with actual print runs).

The fifth edition (1994), which contained close to 20 000 formulas, was electronically reset in preparation for a CD-ROM issue of the fifth edition (1996) and in anticipation of further editions. Since the sixth edition (2000), now corresponding with superscript number "10", Daniel Zwillinger started contributing as well. The last edition being edited by Jeffrey before his death was the seventh English edition published in 2007 (with superscript number "11"). This edition has been retranslated back into Russian as "seventh Russian edition" in 2011.

For the eighth edition (2014/2015, with superscript number "12") Zwillinger took over the role of the editor. He was assisted by Victor Hugo Moll. In order to make room for additional information without increasing the size of the book significantly, the former chapters 11 (on algebraic inequalities), chapters 13 to 16 (on matrices and related results, determinants, norms, ordinary differential equations) and chapter 18 (on z-transforms) worth about 50 pages in total were removed and some chapters renumbered (12 to 11, 17 to 12). This edition contains more than 10 000 entries.

Related projects
In 1995, Alan Jeffrey published his Handbook of Mathematical Formulas and Integrals.
It was partially based on the fifth English edition of Gradshteyn and Ryzhik's Table of Integrals, Series, and Products and meant as an companion, but written to be more accessible for students and practitioners. It went through four editions up to 2008. The fourth edition also took advantage of changes incorporated into the seventh English edition of Gradshteyn and Ryzhik.

Inspired by a 1988 paper in which  proved several integrals in Gradshteyn and Ryzhik, Victor Hugo Moll with George Boros started a project to prove all integrals listed in Gradshteyn and Ryzhik and add additional commentary and references. In the foreword of the book Irresistible Integrals (2004), they wrote:

Nevertheless, the efforts have meanwhile resulted in about 900 entries from Gradshteyn and Ryzhik discussed in a series of more than 30 articles of which papers 1 to 28 have been published in issues 14 to 26 of Scientia, Universidad Técnica Federico Santa María (UTFSM), between 2007 and 2015 and compiled into a two-volume book series Special Integrals of Gradshteyn and Ryzhik: the Proofs (2014–2015) already.

Editions

Russian editions

  400 pages.
  400 pages.
  464 pages (+ errata inlet).
  1100 pages (+ 8 page errata inlet in later print runs). Errata:
  Dark brown fake-leather, 1108 pages.
  l+1182 pages.

German editions
  Gray or green linen, xxiii+438 pages. Errata:
   (Printed by VEB Druckerei "Thomas Müntzer", Bad Langensalza. Distributed in the USA by Plenum Press, Inc., New York.) Green linen, xxiii+438 pages + 4 page errata inlet. Errata:
  Gray linen with gilded embossing by A. W. Schipow, 2 volumes, 677+3 & 504 pages.

Polish edition
  Light grayish cover, 464 pages.

English editions
  Black cloth hardcover with gilt titles, white dust jacket, xiv+1086 pages. Errata:
  xlvi+1160 pages. Errata:
  Blue hardcover with green or blue rectangular and gilt titles, xlvii+1204 pages. Errata:
  Red cover, xlvii+1163 pages. (A reprint edition "积分, 级数和乘积表" by World Books Press became available in China under  /  in April 2004.) Errata:
   xlviii+1171 pages, with CD-ROM. (A reprint edition "积分, 级数和乘积表" by Beijing World Publishing Corporation (世界图书出版公司北京公司 / WPCBJ) became available in China under  /  in May 2007.) Errata:
  xlvi+1133 pages. Errata:

Japanese edition
  xv+1085 pages.

See also
 Prudnikov, Brychkov and Marichev (PBM)
 Bronshtein and Semendyayev (BS)
 Abramowitz and Stegun (AS)
 NIST Handbook of Mathematical Functions (DLMF)
 Jahnke and Emde (JE)
 Magnus and Oberhettinger (MO)

Notes

References

External links
 
 
 
 

1943 non-fiction books
20th-century Russian literature
20th-century German literature

Handbooks and manuals
Mathematics books
Mathematical tables